The 1985 European Aquatics Championships were held in "Cherveno zname" swim complex in Sofia, Bulgaria from 4 August until 11 August 1985. Besides swimming there were titles contested in diving, synchronized swimming and water polo. The first ever women's tournament at the European Championships was played in Oslo, Norway.

Medal table

Swimming

Men's events

Women's events

Diving

Men's events

Women's events

Synchronized swimming

Water polo

Men's event

Women's event

External links
Results

LEN European Aquatics Championships
European Aquatics Championships, 1985
A
European Aquatics Championships, 1985
Aquatics Championships 1985
Aquatics Championships 1985
International sports competitions in Oslo
Sports competitions in Sofia
Swimming competitions in Bulgaria
Aquatics Championships
1980s in Oslo
1980s in Sofia